Dream Sequence is an album by flugelhornist and composer Kenny Wheeler recorded between 1995 and 2003 and released on Evan Parker's Psi label.

Reception

The AllMusic review by Rick Anderson states "These recordings were made over a period of seven years with a shifting group of sidemen; one track, the lovely "Hearken," is a solo piece, and another, the even better "Drum Sequence," is a duo for flügelhorn and drums. The most impressive performances, though, are those that incorporate at least a quartet into the dreamy ambience of Wheeler's musical vision. Very highly recommended".

On All About Jazz, Glenn Astarita noted "In sum, the musicians project a velvety soundscape supplanted by warmly stated choruses and keenly articulated soloing spots. (Highly recommended...)".

The Guardian 's John Fordham noted "Kenny Wheeler, a bold trumpet player who avoids standard songs or familiar licks, is an acquired taste for some. But it doesn't take much close listening to detect a shy exuberance under his melancholy music, and a sophistication that imparts a haunting ambiguity to his themes and liberates improvisers ... As ever with Wheeler, the music is the polar opposite of in-your-face, and most of the tempos are slow to middling. But the gentle harmonies are captivating".

Track listing
All compositions by Kenny Wheeler except where noted.
 "Unti" – 13:45
 "Drum Sequence" – 6:29
 "Dream Sequence" – 5:11
 "Cousin Marie" – 9:35
 "Nonetheless" – 7:05
 "A Flower Is a Lovesome Thing" (Billy Strayhorn) – 7:46
 "Hearken" – 4:52
 "Kind Folks" – 11:46

Personnel
 Kenny Wheeler – flugelhorn
 Ray Warleigh – alto saxophone, flute
 Stan Sulzmann – tenor saxophone
 John Parricelli – guitar
 Chris Laurence – bass
 Anthony Charles Levin – drums

References

2003 albums
Kenny Wheeler albums